Velicham Akale is a 1975 Indian Malayalam film, directed by Crossbelt Mani and produced by S. Parameswaran. The film stars Sreelatha Namboothiri, Cochin Haneefa, Bahadoor and K. P. Ummer in the lead roles. The film has musical score by R. K. Shekhar.

Cast
 
Sreelatha Namboothiri 
Cochin Haneefa 
Bahadoor 
K. P. Ummer 
KPAC Sunny 
Rajakokila 
Ravi Menon 
Reena 
Surasu 
Vincent

Soundtrack
The music was composed by R. K. Shekhar and the lyrics were written by Vayalar.

References

External links
 

1975 films
1970s Malayalam-language films
Films directed by Crossbelt Mani